Nayattu is a 2021 Indian political survival thriller film directed and co-produced by Martin Prakkat and written by Shahi Kabir. It stars Kunchako Boban, Joju George and Nimisha Sajayan in the lead roles and features Jaffar Idukki, Anil Nedumangad and Hakkim Shajahan in supporting roles. Mahesh Narayanan and Rajesh Rajenndrran edit the film while Shyju Khalid handles the cinematography. Vishnu Vijay composed the original music and background score. Director Ranjith and P. M. Sasidharan produced the film under Gold Coin Motion Picture Company in association with Martin Prakkat Films. 

The film was released on 8 April 2021 to widespread critical acclaim for its direction and the cast's performances. On October it made shortlist for India's selection for Best International film at 94th Academy Awards

Plot
Praveen Michael rejoins the police force in a new station as a CPO (civil police officer). A local political goon, Biju, who is related to police officer CPO Sunitha, is summoned for being a constant trouble-maker. Praveen and his senior officer (Asst Sub Inspector) ASI Maniyan get into a scuffle with the goon and locks him up in the cell. But soon, he is released without charges due to political influence of his Dalit party.

After a wedding party, Maniyan and Praveen are drunk, joined by Sunitha who accepts a lift. With Maniyan's nephew Rahul as driver, they get into a collision with a motorbike. They move to assist, realizing that the bike rider, Jayan was a friend of Biju’s. Rahul flees from the scene immediately, after which they get spotted by civilians. They attempt to rescue Jayan, who was however announced dead on arrival, sending the Biju’s mob into a rage, forcing the trio to flee to their station.

At the station, Maniyan realizes that they will be accused of murder and arrested soon, resulting in the trio fleeing and on the run. With political pressure mounting on the Police to frame them, they retreat to Munnar to seek asylum with an old acquaintance of Maniyan.

The chief minister himself gets involved in the matter due to an impending by election where the support of Dalit organization is crucial for victory. A squad of senior police officers, lead by SP Anuradha are sent in pursuit of the fugitives. They manage to locate the runaways, but can not launch an assault due to the strategic location of their hiding place. Back in the city, Police decides to stage a drama with the allowance of the chief minister. They announce that all three police officers are arrested and parades dummies with face covered to the media.

When the squad finally makes the move, Praveen and Sunitha runs, only to find Maniyan hanging dead in a building with a suicide video note in his mobile phone, as a dying declaration. Due to the previous dummy arrest, the squad is in trouble. The chief minister threatens blame on the police department, ordering them to clean up the mess. Praveen tries to escape to safeguard the suicide video but is captured and is arrested along with Sunitha and is brought to the police club along with Maniyan’s body.

Police officers stage Maniyan's suicide in the police custody and compels the other two to give corroborating statements, which make Maniyan responsible for the death of the Dalit youth and thus making them free of the crime. When Praveen and Sunitha both refuse, they are given time to change their mind till they get to the court. They are then placed in custody and transported to court in a police van, as the voting for the by-elections take, they go to  the court.

Cast
 Kunchako Boban as CPO Praveen Michael
 Joju George as ASI Maniyan
 Nimisha Sajayan as CPO Sunitha
 Jaffar Idukki as Chief Minister of Kerala
 Yama Gilgamesh as SP Anuradha
 Anil Nedumangad as DYSP Santhosh, Crime Branch
Vinod Sagar as Moorthi 
 Hakkim Shajahan as Hakkim
Abhilash Vijay as Crime Branch Officer Kishore
 Samson Matthew Valiyaparambil as Chief Secretary
 Ajit Koshy as DGP
 Manohari Joy as Praveen's Mother
 Dineesh P as Biju
Arafaath Ansaari as Praveen's Friend
Sminu Sijo as Maniyan's Wife
Ajayan Adat as Doctor
Jineesh Chandran as Rahul

Production
Principal photography of the film began before the COVID-19 pandemic and stopped during lockdown period. The filming resumed by the end of September and was completed in October 2020.

Music
Music was composed by Vishnu Vijay.

Release
The movie was released on 8 April 2021.

Reception
A video review was published in Tamil satellite channel Jaya TV.

Accolades

References

External links
 

2020s Malayalam-language films
2021 films
Films directed by Martin Prakkat
Indian thriller drama films
Films shot in Munnar
Indian political thriller films
Indian survival films
Indian police films
Fictional portrayals of the Kerala Police